Klytia (minor planet designation: 73 Klytia) is a main-belt asteroid. It was the second and last asteroid discovery by the prolific comet discoverer Horace Tuttle, on April 7, 1862. It is named after Clytia, who loved Helios in Greek mythology. Of the first one hundred numbered asteroids, Klytia is the smallest.

The lightcurve shows some shape irregularities. There are two valid solutions for the pole's ecliptic coordinates: (λ1, β1) = (38°, +75°) and (λ2, β2) = (237°, +73°).

References

External links 
 
 

Background asteroids
Klytia
Klytia
S-type asteroids (Tholen)
18620407